Hegyhátsál is a village in Vas county, Hungary.

Places of interest 
 Hegyhát Observatory (Hegyhát Observatory Foundation)
 Hegyhátsál TV Tower
 Maria with her child
 Old village house

External links 
 Website of Hegyhátsál
 Website of the Hegyhát Observatory (Hegyhát Observatory Foundation)

Populated places in Vas County